The 1955 Vanderbilt Commodores football team represented Vanderbilt University during the 1955 college football season. The team's head coach was Art Guepe, who was in his third year as the Commodores' head coach.  Members of the Southeastern Conference, the Commodores played their home games at Dudley Field in Nashville, Tennessee.  In 1955, Vanderbilt went 8–3 overall with a conference record of 4–3 this was the best SEC record for Vandy until 2012 when they had an SEC record of 5–3. The team was led by Don Orr and Charley Horton.

Schedule

References

Vanderbilt
Vanderbilt Commodores football seasons
Gator Bowl champion seasons
Vanderbilt Commodores football